Jaanu may refer to:

 Jaanu (2012 film), a 2012 Indian Kannada-language film
 Jaanu (2020 film), a 2020 Indian Telugu-language film

See also
 Ok Jaanu, a 2017 Indian Hindi-language film